Ayla Patakata is a village in Barguna District in the Barisal Division of southern-central Bangladesh.

References

Populated places in Barguna District